Cherupuzha is a town in Kannur district, Kerala, India. It is the headquarters of the Cherupuzha Panchayat which is a special grade panchayat in Kerala.

Location
It is located about 31 km east of taluk HQ Payyanur, 66 km north east of district HQ Kannur, 524 km from Capital city Thiruvananthapuram, 332 km away from Eranakulam, 150 km from Kozhikode, 121 km away from Mangalore and 326 km from Bangalore.

History 

Cherupuzha and its surrounding areas was ruled by many royal dynasties in the past, including the Mooshika dynasty of Ezhimala, Chirakkal dynasty of Kolathunadu, Tipu Sultan of the Kingdom of Mysore, before it became a part of the British Raj. The original inhabitants of the area were primarily Hindus. Later on this region gained a sizable Christian and Muslim population. Now the place has Christians as majority. The economy was agrarian with strong feudal system - Janmi-Kudiyan system - permeating everyday life in past and in the present mainly small and medium farmers.

Geography
Cherupuzha is a hilly town (part of Western Ghats) on the eastern side of Kannur district.  The terrain is undulating in nature and the extreme eastern side has forests bordering Karnataka state.

Tourism

Surrounded by green terrains and mesmerizing hills, Tejaswini river in Cherupuzha offers adventurous tourist activity like white water rafting in Western ghats. Kollada near Cherupuzha is the starting point to kick off the rafting trip on the river.  The rafting experience at Cherupuzha is an ideal stepping stone for those who aspires challenging high altitude rapids. Inflatable rafts are used here which is less expensive and easily maintained. White Water Rafting at Tejaswini river is one of the 17 best places for rafting in India.

Demographics
As of 2011 Census, Cherupuzha Grama Panchayat had a population of 30,733 where 15,004 are males and 15,729 are females. There were 7,052 families residing in the panchayat limits. The sex ratio of Cherupuzha was 1,048 lower than state average of 1,084. In Cherupuzha, 9.7% of the population was under 6 years of age.

Average literacy rate of Cherupuzha was 95% higher than state average of 94%. Male literacy stands at 96.3% and Female literacy at 93.7%.

Administration
Cherupuzha Grama Panchayat is a part of Payyanur Block Panchayat. Cherupuzha Panchayat is politically a part of Payyanur Assembly constituency in Kasaragod Loksabha constituency.

Connectivity

Satellite towns that are nearby and places at a longer distance which has direct bus route from Cherupuzha includes Pulingome, Palavayal, Kozhichal, Thirumeni, Padiyotchal, Peringome, Chittarikkal, Vellarikundu, Panathur, Alakkode, Chemperi, Payyavoor, Iritty, Payyanur, Kanhangad, Taliparamba, Kannur, Kasaragod, Kozhikode, Mangalore, Bangalore, Ernakulam, Thrissur, Thodupuzha, Pala, Kottayam, Pathanamthitta etc. These population centres are well connected to Cherupuzha by road.

Water bodies
Tejaswini River, also called "kariankode puzha" in Malayalam, which is comparatively small among 44 rivers of Kerala, flows beside this town. It originates from Brahmagiri hills of Coorg forest in Karnataka, enters Kerala near Pulingome, flows through the districts of Kannur and Kasaragod and meets the Arabian Ocean, near Nileshwaram as a part of Valiyaparamba Backwaters. Tejaswini, which is 64 km long, do have a rafting stretch of 20 km with plenty of rapids extending up to class-3.

Places of worship

 Kottathalachi Mount
 Cherupuzha Shri Ayyappa Temple
 St. Mary's Forane Church
 Pulingome Makhaam
 St. Joseph's Church Pulingome
 St. Sebastians Church Kozhichal
 Kokkadavu Sivapuram Mahadeva Temple, Kokkadavu
 Holy Family Church Koluvally
 St. Agustines Church Rajagiri
 St. Antony's Church Thirumeni
 Baptist Church Kokkadavu (Thirumeni)
 Narambil Bhagavathy
 Kripalayam Retreat Center 
 Thulaseevanam Mahavishnu Temple, Muthuvom, Thirumeni
 Cattiyoorkkavu Arakkal Bhagavathi Temple, Thirumeni
 St. Alphonsa Church Mulapra

Transport

Air 

The nearest airport (70 km) is at Mattanur and Mangalore, Calicut are not far away. All of them are international airports but direct flights are available only to Middle Eastern countries.

Rail 

The nearest railway station is 34 km away Payyanur on Shoranur-Mangalore Section.
Direct trains are available to Mumbai, Delhi, Bangalore, Mangalore, Ernakulam, Kozhikode, Thiruvananthapuram, Chennai and other parts of the country.

Roads
Kerala Hill Highway (SH 59) passes through Cherupuzha town connects it with Iritty and other towns in eastern areas of Kannur and Kasaragod districts. Mysore and Bangalore can be accessed on the eastern side of Iritty.

The National Highway(NH 66) passes through Perumba junction through proposed Ezhimala - Bagamandalam Highway. Goa and Mumbai can be accessed on the northern side and Cochin and Thiruvananthapuram can be accessed on the southern side.

Two main roads are Cherupuzha-Payyanur and Cherupuzha - Alakode. All the other roads in this area were built by the people themselves.  The roads, Cherupuzha-Pulingome – Kottathalachi, Edavaramba – Koombankunnu, Kariyakkara – Koombankunnu, Cherupuzha-Pulingome-Rajagiri, Rajagiri-Josegiri, Vazhakkundam – Churappadavu, Chunda – Vilakkuvettam and Umayanchal – Kottathalachi are examples of the collective effort of people of Cherupuzha and Pulingome.

Another important road in the area is Cherupuzha-Thirumeni- Muthuvom road which is of a length of 9 kilometers. From Thirumeni, one can reach to its outskirts like Chathamangalam, Thabore, Muthuvom and Korali.
Both private and public transport buses are available from Cherupuzha to Kannur, Kozhikode, Cochin and Bangalore.

Proposed Ezhimala-Bengaluru road 
A new bridge, for the proposed Ezhimala-Payyanur-Cherupuzha-Pulingome-Talakkaveri-Bhagamandala-Bengaluru road,  has already been constructed over Pulingome river near Cherupuzha, connecting Kerala and Karnataka.  Talks are on between Karnataka, Kerala and central Governments on this project. However, Karnataka was not willing to construct the road along the reserve forest and the project got stuck. If this road became a reality, the distance to Bangalore and Mysore would be reduced by more than 60 kilometers also 120 kilometers between Kannur and Bangalore. The road is strategically important for the northern part of the state because it connects two major institutions, the Indian Naval Academy in Ezhimala and the Central Reserve Police Force (CRPF) training centre in Peringome with Karnataka.

Cherupuzha-Chittarikkal

This road stretching across Kerala, connecting Kannur and Kasaragod districts.

The development for bypass route from Cherupuzha traverses through Prapoyil, Thirumeni, Chathamangalam, Parappa, Karthikapuram Road is still underway, but very significant because it connects Cherupuzha to places like Karthikapuram, Parappa, Neduvode and Rayarome at the shortest distance. This is the only road that goes through the common meeting place of Cherupuzha, Alakode and Udayagiri panchayaths. Efforts are on to renovate the road completely and make it the bypass of Alakode-Therthaly-Cherupuzha Road. The advantage is in case of any complication on the major road, the bypass can be used.

Hanging Bridge
The major attraction in Cherupuzha is a hanging bridge in Tejaswini river (also known as karyamkode puzha) which connects both Kasaragod and Kannur districts.

Hospitals
St. Sebastian's Hospital Kakkayamchal
Cherupuzha Co-operative Hospital
K Karunakaran Memorial Super Speciality Hospital

Education

 Navajyothi College
 Our College of Applied Science, Timiri
 St. Joseph's Higher Secondary School 
 St. Mary's High School
 Archangels Public School (CBSE)
 JMUP School
 Government HSS, Prapoyil
 GVHSS, Pulingome

See also
 Pulingome, 6 Km east of Cherupuzha
 Kozhichal, 11 Km east of Cherupuzha
 Chathamangalam (Kannur), 10 Km south of Cherupuzha
 Padiyotchal, 4.5 Km west of Cherupuzha
 Peringome, 10 Km west of Cherupuzha
 Thirumeni, 8 Km south of Cherupuzha
 Chittarikkal, 6 Km north of Cherupuzha

References

Cities and towns in Kannur district
Villages near Payyanur